Alimardani is a surname. Notable people with the surname include:

Haman Alimardani (born 1977), Iranian fashion designer, graphic designer, and DJ
Mohsen Alimardani (born 1968), Iranian politician

Persian-language surnames